Lieutenant General Nadeem Taj , HI(M) (born 29 April 1953) is a retired three-star general in the Pakistan Army who served as its Adjutant General (AG) in the GHQ. Previously, he headed the ISI and the Military Intelligence. He was also the Commander of the XXX Corps at Gujranwala.

Musharraf's aide
Taj was commissioned in the Pakistan Army's Punjab Regiment in August 1972 in the 2nd Special War Course. His name came into prominence when he as a Brigadier General was accompanying then Chairman of Joint Chiefs of Staff and Chief of Army Staff General Pervez Musharraf on his way back from Sri Lanka on 12 October 1999 when their plane was denied landing on the orders of Nawaz Sharif at Jinnah Terminal, Karachi, brewing a crisis that ultimately led to overthrow of the Government of Premier Nawaz Sharif. 

Taj was also with Musharraf during the assassination attempts on him in December 2003.

Chief of Intelligence
Taj was promoted to Major General on 1 February 2002 and was already serving as the Military Secretary (MS) to the President of Pakistan (different from Military Secretary (MS), GHQ). It was during this time when Musharraf's convoy was attacked in Rawalpindi. 

Shortly after that incident, Taj was appointed Director General of Military Intelligence (DGMI) in December 2003 in the place of Tariq Majid who was promoted to Lieutenant General and took charge as the new Chief of General Staff. Major General Shafaat Ullah Shah took the place of Taj and became the new Military Secretary to the President. Taj continued as the DGMI until February 2005, when he was replaced by Major Gen Mian Nadeem Ijaz Ahmed.

Command and staff appointments
On 29 September 2008, The Australian reported that "Washington is understood to be exerting intense pressure on Pakistan to remove ISI boss Nadeem Taj and two of his deputies because of the key agency's alleged "double-dealing" with the militants."

Taj took over the XXX Corps after the incumbent Lt Gen Waseem Ahmad Ashraf retired from the army on 4 October 2008. He was later relieved of his duties and made the Adjutant General (AG) of the Pakistan Army on 29 April 2010, replacing Lt Gen Javed Zia who in turn was appointed as Commander Southern Command in Quetta.

References

 

Pakistani generals
Directors General of Inter-Services Intelligence
Living people
1953 births
Lieutenant generals
Recipients of Hilal-i-Imtiaz
Pakistan Military Academy alumni